The phrase Palm Sunday tornado outbreak may refer to any of the following historical tornado outbreaks within the continental United States:
1920 Palm Sunday tornado outbreak, the earliest of the Palm Sunday outbreaks
1965 Palm Sunday tornado outbreak, the most famous and violent of the Palm Sunday outbreaks
1994 Palm Sunday tornado outbreak, the most recent of the Palm Sunday outbreaks
While not commonly referred to as a "Palm Sunday tornado outbreak", the 1936 Tupelo-Gainesville tornado outbreak also occurred on Palm Sunday